The 1973 Tendring District Council election were the first elections to the newly created Tendring District Council. They took place on 7 June 1973. This was on the same day as other local elections. The Local Government Act 1972 stipulated that the elected members were to shadow and eventually take over from the predecessor corporation on 1 April 1974.

Summary

Election result

|}

References

Tendring District Council elections
1973 English local elections
1970s in Essex